Arıkonak is a village in the Sincik District, Adıyaman Province, Turkey. It is populated by Kurds of the Reşwan tribe and had a population of 174 in 2021.

The hamlets of Budak, Karaca, Küpeli, Örenbaşı and Yamaçlı are attached to Arıkonak.

References

Villages in Sincik District

Kurdish settlements in Adıyaman Province